Amir Masoud Momeni (Persian: امیرمسعود مومنی,born 15 August 1994, in Isfahan, Iran) is a singer, announcer, and bodybuilder.

Music career 
Amir Masoud Momeni first turned to sports and then entered art. He won the European Fitness gold medal. This happened at the age of 21, and then spent a short time in CrossFit, but due to injuries and personal issues, he gave up the sport and turned to art.

Podcast and announcer 
He started broadcasting and podcasting in 2015 and has released podcasts including Bi Khodafezi, Gard, Khandam, Focus.

Single tracks

Podcasts

References 

Living people
Iranian singers
1994 births
Bodybuilders